Rizwan Akram (born 26 September 1979) is a Dutch former cricketer and now an umpire. In April 2018, he was appointed to the International Cricket Council's (ICC) Panel of Development Umpires. In June 2018, he was named as one of the umpires for the 2018 Netherlands Tri-Nation Series. On 12 June 2018, he stood in his first Twenty20 International (T20I) match, between the Netherlands and Ireland. On 1 August 2018, he stood in his first One Day International (ODI) match, between the Netherlands and Nepal.

In January 2022, he was named as one of the on-field umpires for the 2022 ICC Under-19 Cricket World Cup in the West Indies.

See also
 List of One Day International cricket umpires
 List of Twenty20 International cricket umpires

References

External links
 

1979 births
Living people
Dutch cricket umpires
Dutch One Day International cricket umpires
Dutch Twenty20 International cricket umpires
Sportspeople from Amsterdam